Nandivarman III was an Indian monarch of the Nandivarman II line who ruled the Pallava kingdom from 846 to 869. He was the son of Dantivarman and grandson of Nandivarman II.

Reign 

Nandivarman III, who was a powerful monarch, tried to reverse the decline that began in the reign of his father. He made an alliance with the Rashtrakutas and the Gangas and defeated the Pandyas at the Battle of Tellaru. He then pursued the retreating Pandyan army as far as the river Vaigai. The Pandyan king Srimara Srivallabha, however, recovered most of his territories and even defeated the Pallavas at Kumbakonam.

Nandivarman had a powerful navy and maintained trade contacts with Siam and Malaya.

References 

 

Pallava kings